A stimulus package is most often a government program providing economic stimulus.

Examples include:
 Economic Stimulus Appropriations Act of 1977
 Economic Stimulus Act of 2008
 American Recovery and Reinvestment Act of 2009
 Thai Khem Khaeng
 Kenya Economic Stimulus Program
 Chinese economic stimulus program
 July Jobs Stimulus
 ROC consumer voucher
 Triple Stimulus Voucher
 CARES Act
 American Rescue Plan Act of 2021

 Fiscal policy
 Keynesian economics